The William Averiett House, near Sylacauga, Alabama, dates from 1866. It was listed on the National Register of Historic Places in 1986.

It is vernacular Cottage orné in style.

It is also known as The Averiett Place.

This was listed along with three other properties as part of a study of the estate.

See also
Benjamin H. Averiett House
Goodwin-Hamilton House
Welch-Averiett House

References

National Register of Historic Places in Talladega County, Alabama
Houses completed in 1867